Ruler of Your Own World (lit. "Do As You Wish") is a 2002 South Korean television series starring Lee Na-young and Yang Dong-geun. It was written by In Jung-ok and directed by Park Sung-soo.

Often regarded as the best Korean drama of 2002, the series was critically praised for its daring realism and refusal to rely on K-drama conventions.

Synopsis 
Go Bok-su (Yang Dong-geun) has had a difficult childhood and served time in prison. He has a longtime girlfriend, Song Mi-rae (Gong Hyo-jin) who is a cheerleader of the LG Twins. Jeon Kyung (Lee Na-young), a moody tomboy and a daughter of a rich family, is the keyboardist of an unknown indie rock band.

The lead female vocalist of Kyung's band is diagnosed with a brain injury due to an accident, and her fellow band members try to earn money for the surgical procedure that might save her life. Kyung begs her father, an authoritative hotel owner, but is unable to get the funds. One day Bok-su steals Kyung's wallet which contains the money for the operation.

Cast 
 Yang Dong-geun as Go Bok-su
 Lee Na-young as Jeon Kyung
 Gong Hyo-jin as Song Mi-rae
 Lee Dong-gun as Han Dong-jin 
 Shin Goo as Go Joong-sup (Bok-su's father)
 Youn Yuh-jung as Jung Yoo-soon (Bok-su's mother)
 Jo Kyung-hwan as Jeon Nak-kwan (Jeon Kyung's father)
 Lee Hye-sook as Kang In-ok (Jeon Kyung's mother)
 Lee Se-chang as Jeon Kang (Jeon Kyung's brother)
 Kim Myung-kook as Sgt. Park Jung-dal
 Heo In-bum as Ko Boong-yi (Junior)
 Jeon Hye-jin as Song Hyun-ji (Mi-rae's sister)
 Kim Jae-wook as Ki-hong (band member)
 Kim Jae-man as Jung-kook (band member)

References

External links 
 Ruler of Your Own World official MBC website 
 Ruler of Your Own World at YA Entertainment
 
 

Korean-language television shows
2002 South Korean television series debuts
2002 South Korean television series endings
MBC TV television dramas
South Korean romance television series